The Race (French original title Le Raid) is a 2002 French movie directed by Djamel Bensalah starring Hélène de Fougerolles and Roschdy Zem.

Plot 
Four pathetic narrow minded petty criminals are mistaken for hitmen while ordered to shadow the philandering girl friend of their crime boss Carlito. As a result of a misunderstanding they get hired to accompany Léonore de Segonzac, the heiress of a big asset, on a race through Patagonia and "accidentally" kill her for the sum of four million dollars. They are chased by the principal and the true killers, which for their part are hunted by some UNO blue helmets.

Cast 

 Hélène de Fougerolles : Léonore de Segonzac
 Roschdy Zem : Sami
 Atmen Kelif : Yaya
 Lorànt Deutsch : Tacchini
 Julien Courbey : Kader
 Josiane Balasko : Madame Jo
 Maurice Barthélémy : Momo
 Gérard Jugnot : Carlito
 Didier Flamand : Lino
 Pascal Elbé : Mathias Morin
 Yves Rénier : UN Colonel
 Mouss Diouf : UN Captain
 Omar Sy : UN Sergeant
 Axelle Laffont : Nathalie
 Marina Foïs : Young nurse
 Sacha Bourdo : Windshield cleaner

References

External links 
 

French action adventure films
2000s French films
French action comedy films